Ricky L. Polston (born November 24, 1955 in Dothan, Alabama) has been a justice of the Florida Supreme Court since his appointment in 2008 and was the chief justice of the court from July 2012 to June 2014. He is a graduate of Florida State University College of Law.

Background 
Polston was raised in Graceville, Florida, and graduated from Graceville High School in 1973 as valedictorian. He received an Associate of Arts from Chipola College in 1975, and a Bachelor of Science, summa cum laude, from Florida State University in 1977. In 1986, he received his Juris Doctor with high honors from the Florida State University College of Law.

Polston is married to children's book author Deborah Ehler Polston. They have ten children, including six whom they have adopted. Described as an "active Christian" by the Miami Herald in 2013, Polston wrote of himself,  “I am a product and reflection of Florida. My children are racially diverse, which gives me a better appreciation of different cultures and how they react to each other. In short, I am not isolated as a judge.”

Polston has been a certified public accountant since 1978 and worked as a public accountant from 1977–1984. After becoming an attorney, Polston was in private practice from 1987–2000. Governor Jeb Bush appointed him a judge of the First District Court of Appeal of Florida on January 2, 2001, where he served until his appointment to the Florida Supreme Court. During his service on the Court of Appeals, Polston heard over 6,000 appellate cases. Since 2003, Polston has also worked as an adjunct professor at Florida State University College of Law, teaching the Florida Constitutional Law class there for several years.

Supreme Court appointment 
Governor Charlie Crist appointed Polston to the Florida Supreme Court on October 1, 2008 to replace Kenneth B. Bell, who resigned that day to return to private practice. Polston was sworn in the next day. He was the second of Crist's four appointments to the Florida Supreme Court.

Justice Polston was elected unanimously to serve as Florida's 55th Chief Justice of the Florida Supreme Court, starting July 1, 2012. Polston, who served a two-year term in the office, is the first Florida State Law alumn to be selected as Chief Justice of the Florida Supreme Court.

References

External links

 Florida Supreme Court Profile
 Hafenbrack, Josh, "Crist names Ricky Polston to Florida Supreme Court," Orlando Sentinel, October 1, 2008.
 Flemming, Paul, "Gov. Crist names Panhandle native to state high court," Pensacola News Journal, October 1, 2008.
 Liberto, Jennifer, "Polston to join state Supreme Court," St. Petersburg Times, October 2, 2008.

1956 births
20th-century American lawyers
21st-century American lawyers
21st-century American judges
People from Dothan, Alabama
Florida State University faculty
Living people
Florida State University alumni
Florida State University College of Law alumni
Justices of the Florida Supreme Court
Judges of the Florida District Courts of Appeal
Chief Justices of the Florida Supreme Court
People from Graceville, Florida